The 1900 West Virginia Mountaineers football team was an American football team that represented West Virginia University as an independent during the 1900 college football season. In its first and only season under head coach John Ethan Hill, the team compiled a 4–3 record and was outscored by a total of 104 to 53. Roscoe C. Brown was the team captain.

Schedule

References

West Virginia
West Virginia Mountaineers football seasons
West Virginia Mountaineers football